Oldambt is a region in the northeast of the province Groningen in the Netherlands. It is located on the Dutch-German border.

Regions of Groningen (province)